The Gabonese Socialist Party (PSG) is a small political party in Gabon.

History
The party was established in 1991, and merged into the African Forum for Reconstruction the following year.

In 2006 the party's Augustin Moussavou King contested the presidential elections; he finished fourth out of five candidates with 0.33% of the vote. It supported Pierre Mamboundou of the Union of the Gabonese People in the 2009 elections; Mamboundou finished third with 25% of the vote.

References

1991 establishments in Gabon
Political parties established in 1991
Political parties in Gabon
Socialism in Gabon
Socialist parties in Africa